Sakari Halonen (1923–1992) was a Finnish singer and stage, film and television actor.

Selected filmography
 The General's Fiancée (1951)
 The Millionaire Recruit (1953)

External links 
 

1923 births
1992 deaths
People from Kuopio
20th-century Finnish male singers
Finnish male stage actors
Finnish male film actors
Finnish male television actors